Del Campo High School,  is a public high school in Fair Oaks, California. It is a member of the San Juan Unified School District and serves western Fair Oaks and eastern Carmichael.

Academic curriculum
Del Campo’s academic program is validated by an Academic Performance Index increase of 56 points over a three-year period. In 1995, Del Campo adopted the 4X4 Block Schedule which enables students to focus on four ninety-two-minute classes each term. This allows students to complete eight more classes than others would on a traditional schedule to prepare for the academic demands of university.  In 1996, Del Campo High School received California Distinguished High School honors. College prep classesmay include honors classes in English, Science, and Social Studies, as well as Advanced Placement classes in Biology, Calculus AB & BC, Chemistry, Microeconomics, English Language, English Literature, French, Spanish, Statistics,  U.S. Government,  and U.S. History.  Tutoring is a component of the AVID program.

Students who are members of the yearbook, the Decamhian, or the newspaper, the ROAR, as well as cadets in the Air Force JROTC program, have been nationally recognized for performance in the programs. A Fine and Performing Arts program affords students opportunities in music, art and theater. Del Campo also has an Academic Decathlon program; the school has performed well in the Sacramento County competition since the 1980s.

Extracurricular activities 

 Air Force JROTC CA-863rd Cadet Squadron
 Yearbook The Decamhian - Del Campo's yearbook, the Decamhian (short for Del Campo High Annual), has received 16 National Pacemaker Awards and 13 National Scholastic Press Association All-American Awards, as well as 14 Gold Crown Awards and 2 Silver Crown Awards awarded by Columbia Scholastic Press Association
 Newspaper The ROAR - winner of a Gold Medal from the American Scholastic Press Association, as well as a six-time winner of the Columbia Press Association’s Gold Medal
 AVID Del Campo is a National Demonstration school. It usually graduates the AVID class with 100% college enrollment.
 DC Daily DC Daily is a Student Educational Video Award (SEVA) winning student produced live daily broadcast to Del Campo students, staff and community.

Notable alumni 
 Dusty Baker - former Major League Baseball player, manager of Washington Nationals, San Francisco Giants, Chicago Cubs (Class of 1967)
 Jason Barnes - Canadian Football League's Edmonton Eskimos wide receiver
 Matt Barnes - forward for 2017 NBA champion Golden State Warriors who has played for nine NBA teams
 Betsy Butler - California State Assemblywoman (Class of 1981) 
 Donald Butler - linebacker for San Diego Chargers, 79th overall pick in 2010 NFL Draft (Class of '06)
 Akiem Hicks - professional football player with Tampa Bay Buccaneers, 89th pick in 2012 NFL Draft
 Tom Johnson - PGA Tour golfer
 Kurt Knudsen - professional baseball player
 Lisa Ling - television personality and host of National Geographic Channel's Explorer
 John Freeman (Class of 1992) - Author, Founder of Freeman's, Editor at Granta. 
Sam Long (born 1995) - San Francisco Giants baseball player
 Rick Schu - nine-year MLB infielder
 Spencer Stone - Former staff sergeant of the United States Air Force, known for foiling a 2015 terrorist attack in France.
 Rene Syler- former host of The Early Show on CBS (Class of 1981)
 Anthony Padilla and Ian Hecox - co-founders of Smosh (Class of '05)

References

External links 
 Del Campo High School Website

Fair Oaks, California
High schools in Sacramento County, California
Educational institutions established in 1963
Public high schools in California
1963 establishments in California